Asmir Kolašinac (born 15 October 1984) is a Serbian shot putter who competed at the 2008 Beijing Olympics, 2012 London Olympics, 2016 Rio Olympics and 2020 Tokyo Olympics. In 2013, Kolašinac was European Indoor Champion in shot put. He is coached by Mišo Đurić and Nikola Tomasović.

Career

Kolašinac was a finalist at the 2010 European Athletics Championships, where he placed ninth overall. He has competed for Serbia in indoor track and field events, including the 2010 IAAF World Indoor Championships and the 2011 European Athletics Indoor Championships. Outside of major competitions, he won gold and silver medal at the 2010 and 2012 European Cup Winter Throwing, respectively.

He achieved a personal best throw of 20.50 m in Novi Sad in June 2011, becoming the first Serbian track and field athlete to achieve the "A" Standard for the 2012 London Olympic Games. He primarily uses the spin technique. He improved his best to 20.64 m at the 2012 Gugl Indoor Meeting in Germany in February. In Olympic final he was placed 7th with a throw 20.71 m.

At the 2012 European Championship he won a bronze medal, at the 2013 European Indoor Championship he became European Champion and at the 2015 European Indoor Championship he won silver. These are the greatest achievements in his career so far.

In addition to his personal best of 21.58 m outdoors and former national record of 21.06 m indoors, he achieved a personal best throw of 63.18 m in the javelin.

Personal life
Kolašinac is an ethnic Bosniak, and practising Muslim. His parents, Spaho and Muradija, lived briefly in Skopje where he was born, but then returned to their hometown of Sjenica in southwestern Serbia. He is a supporter of FK Partizan. He is currently studying at the University of Sport and Physical Education in Sarajevo.

Statistics

International competitions

References

External links

 
 
 
 
  (archive)
 OTAC KOLAŠINCA: Jedva čekamo našeg zlatnog sina! 
 Колашинац и Томашевићева атлетичари године 
 У атлетици нема посла ни за најбољег 

1984 births
Living people
Bosniaks of Serbia
Serbian male shot putters
Olympic athletes of Serbia
Athletes (track and field) at the 2008 Summer Olympics
Athletes (track and field) at the 2012 Summer Olympics
Athletes (track and field) at the 2016 Summer Olympics
Sportspeople from Skopje
People from Sjenica
European Athletics Championships medalists
World Athletics Championships athletes for Serbia
Serbian Muslims
European champions for Serbia
Athletes (track and field) at the 2020 Summer Olympics
Athletes (track and field) at the 2022 Mediterranean Games
Mediterranean Games silver medalists for Serbia
Mediterranean Games medalists in athletics